Dylan Clarke (born 6 September 1998) is a former professional Australian rules footballer playing for the Essendon Football Club in the Australian Football League (AFL). He is the younger brother of Sydney's Ryan Clarke.
He was educated at St Joseph's College, Ferntree Gully and Melbourne Grammar School.

Clarke was recruited with pick 63 in the 2016 national draft. He made his senior debut against the Geelong Cats in round 9 of the 2018 AFL season.

He was called up for his second game in Round 11, 2019. Clarke lined up on Carlton captain and Brownlow Medal favorite Patrick Cripps, and kept him to the quietest game of his entire career, as one of the best players on the ground.

He played in Essendon's next game in Round 13 against Hawthorn, once more playing a tagging role, holding Hawthorn star Jager O'Meara to 14 disposals to three quarter time and 23 for the match, while gathering 23 possessions himself. He was again one of the best players on the ground, and was recognized with the NAB Rising Star nomination for round 13.

References

External links

1998 births
Living people
Essendon Football Club players
Australian rules footballers from Victoria (Australia)
Eastern Ranges players